Marc Nevens (born 6 November 1954) is a Belgian Olympic middle-distance runner.

Nevens was born in Mortsel, the son of cross-country runner and steeplechaser Leon Nevens (1928-1992). In the course of his career Marc Nevens competed at senior level in every distance from 800 metres to 5000 metres. He represented his country in the men's 1500 metres at the 1976 Summer Olympics. His time was a 3:44.18 in the first heat, and a 3:41.52 in the semifinals. At an international athletics meeting in Aarhus, Denmark, later in the same year, he won the 1500-metre event in a time of 3:40.09.

References

1954 births
Living people
Belgian male middle-distance runners
Olympic athletes of Belgium
Athletes (track and field) at the 1976 Summer Olympics
People from Mortsel
Sportspeople from Antwerp Province